The 1917–18 Boston College men's ice hockey season was the inaugural season of play for the program.

Season
Having started their ice hockey program during World War I, when many programs had suspended, Boston College had few options for opponents and had to settle for uncommon opposition. Their third and final game of the year was against future-arch rival Boston University.

Note: Boston College's athletic programs weren't known as the 'Eagles' until 1920.

Roster

Standings

Schedule and Results

|-
!colspan=12 style=";" | Regular Season

References

Boston College Eagles men's ice hockey seasons
Boston College
Boston College
Boston College
Boston College